This is a list of the largest facilities generating electricity through the use of solar thermal power, specifically concentrated solar power.

Operational 

{| class="wikitable sortable"
|+ Operational solar thermal power stations (of at least 50 MW capacity)
|-
!Name!!Country!!Location!!Coordinates
!Electrical capacity (MW)!!Technology type
!Storage hours!!Notes and references
|-
| Noor / Ouarzazate Solar Power Station ||  || Ghassate (Ouarzazate province) ||  
| align="right" | 510|| Parabolic trough and solar power tower (Phase 3)
|3 / 7 / 7.5|| 160 MW Phase 1 with 3 hours heat storage. 200 MW phase 2 with 7 hours heat storage is online from January 2018. 150 MW (Phase 3) with 7.5 hours storage is online from November 2018
|-
|Ivanpah Solar Power Facility || || San Bernardino County, California ||  
| align="right" |392||Solar power tower
| || Completed on February 13, 2014
|-
|Mojave Solar Project ||  || Barstow, California ||  
| align="right" | 280 || Parabolic trough
| || Completed December 2014. Gross capacity of 280 MW corresponds to net capacity of 250 MW
|-
|Solana Generating Station ||  || Gila Bend, Arizona || 
| align="right" |280|| Parabolic trough
|6|| Completed in October 2013, with 6 hours thermal energy storage
|-
|Genesis Solar Energy Project ||  || Blythe, California ||  
| align="right" |280 || Parabolic trough
| ||Online April 24, 2014
|-
|Solaben Solar Power Station ||  || Logrosán ||  
| align="right" |200|| Parabolic trough
| || Solaben 3 completed June 2012Solaben 2 completed October 2012Solaben 1 and 6 completed September 2013
|-
|Mohammed bin Rashid Al Maktoum Solar Park Phase IV||||Dubai|| 
| align="right" | 200 || Parabolic trough,solar tower
||15h|| 100 MW parabolic trough commissioned out of 600 MW  and 100MW solar tower commissioned.
|-
|Solar Energy Generating Systems (SEGS) ||  || Mojave Desert, California ||
| align="right" | 160 ||Parabolic trough
| || Originally collection of 9 units 1984-1990  with 354 MW. Seven units were decommissioned and replaced by solar PV.
|-
|Solnova Solar Power Station ||  || Sanlúcar la Mayor ||
| align="right" | 150|| Parabolic trough
| || Solnova 1 completed May 2010  Solnova 3 completed May 2010  Solnova 4 completed August 2010
|-
|Andasol solar power station ||  || Guadix ||
| align="right" | 150 || Parabolic trough
|7.5|| Completed: Andasol 1 (2008), Andasol 2 (2009), Andasol 3 (2011). Each equipped with a 7.5 hour thermal energy storage.
|-
|Extresol Solar Power Station || ||Torre de Miguel Sesmero ||
| align="right" |150|| Parabolic trough
|7.5||Completed: Extresol 1 and 2 (2010), Extresol 3 (2012). Each equipped with a 7.5-hour thermal energy storage.
|-
| Dhursar ||  || Dhursar, Jaisalmer district ||  
| align="right" | 125 || Fresnel reflector
| || Completed November 2014, referred as 125 MW is some sources
|-
|Ashalim Power Station (Negev Energy) ||  || Ashalim ||  
| align="right" | 121 || Parabolic trough
|4.5|| 4.5h heat storage. Completed August 2019 and located in Negev desert
|-
| Megalim Power Station (Negev Energy) ||  || Ashalim ||  
| align="right" | 121 || Solar power tower
| || Completed April 2019 and located in Negev desert
|-
|Crescent Dunes Solar Energy Project||  || Nye County, Nevada || 
| align="right" | 110 || Solar power tower
|10||with 10h heat storage; commercial operation began September 2015, mothballed since May 2019
|-
|Cerro Dominador Solar Thermal Plant (Atacama 1) ||  || María Elena, Antofagasta |||| align="right" | 110 || Solar power tower || 17.5 ||Completed April 2021, with 17.5h heat storage
|-
| Shouhang Dunhuang ||  || Dunhuang (Gansu Province) ||   
| align="right" |110|| Solar power tower
|15 / 7.5|| Phase I compleded in 2016, Phase II with 7.5h heat storage. Operational since end of December 2018
|-
|Kathu Solar Park ||  || Northern Cape ||  
| align="right" |100|| Parabolic trough
|4.5|| completed February 2018, With 4.5h heat storage

|-
|KaXu Solar One ||  || Pofadder, Northern Cape ||  
| align="right" | 100 || Parabolic trough
|2.5|| with 2.5h heat storage
|-
|Xina Solar One ||  || Pofadder, Northern Cape ||  
| align="right" | 100 || Parabolic trough
|5.5|| Commissioned in September 2017 with 5.5h heat storage
|-
|Manchasol Power Station || || Alcázar de San Juan ||  
| align="right" |100|| Parabolic trough
|7.5|| Manchasol 1 and 2 completed in 2011, each with 7.5h heat storage
|-
|Valle Solar Power Station || || San José del Valle ||  
| align="right" |100|| Parabolic trough
|7.5|| Completed December 2011, with 7.5h heat storage
|-
|Helioenergy Solar Power Station ||  || Écija ||  
| align="right" |100|| Parabolic trough
| || Helioenergy 1 completed September 2011Helioenergy 2 completed January 2012
|-
|Aste Solar Power Station || || Alcázar de San Juan ||  
| align="right" |100|| Parabolic trough
|8|| Aste 1A Completed January 2012, with 8h heat storage Aste 1B Completed January 2012, with 8h heat storage
|-
|Solacor Solar Power Station || || El Carpio ||  
| align="right" |100|| Parabolic trough
| || Solacor 1 completed February 2012Solacor 2 completed March 2012
|-
|Helios Solar Power Station|| || Puerto Lápice ||  
| align="right" |100|| Parabolic trough
| || Helios 1 completed May 2012Helios 2 completed August 2012
|-
|Shams solar power station ||  || Abu Dhabi Madinat Zayed || 
| align="right" | 100|| Parabolic trough
| || Shams 1 completed March 2013 
|-
|Termosol Solar Power Station || || Navalvillar de Pela || 
| align="right" |100|| Parabolic trough
| || Both Termosol 1 and 2 completed in 2013
|-
| Palma del Río I & II || || Palma del Río || 
| align="right" |100|| Parabolic trough
| || Palma del Rio 2 completed December 2010Palma del Rio 1 completed July 2011
|-
| Ilanga 1 ||  || Northern Cape (Upington) ||   
| align="right" |100|| Parabolic trough
|5|| With 5h heat storage. Operational since 2018
|-
| CSNP Royal Tech Urat CSP ||  || Urat Middle Banner,  Inner Mongolia || 
| align="right" |100|| Parabolic trough || 10 || Completed in January 2020 with 10 hours of thermal storage 
|-
|Martin Next Generation Solar Energy Center ||  || Indiantown, Florida ||
| align="right" |75||ISCC with parabolic trough
| || Completed December 2010
|-
|Nevada Solar One|| || Boulder City, Nevada ||
| align="right" |75|| Parabolic trough
| || Operational since 2007
|-
| Dacheng Dunhuang CSP ||  || Dunhuang, Gansu Province ||
| align="right" |60|| Fresnel reflector || 16 / 15 || 10 MW Phase 1 completed in 2016,
50 MW Phase 2 in December 2019 with 15 hours of thermal storage
|-
| Supcon Solar Delingha ||  || Delingha || 
| align="right" |60|| Solar power tower
| 2 / 7
| 10 MW Phase 1 completed in 2013, Phase 2 completed in December 2018 with 7 hours of thermal energy storage

|-
| Guzmán || || Palma del Río ||  
| align="right" |50|| Parabolic trough
| || Completed July 2012
|-
|Khi Solar One ||  || Upington ||  
| align="right" | 50 ||Solar power tower
|2|| Completed Feb 2016  With 2h heat storage
|-
|Bokpoort ||  || Groblershoop ||  
| align="right" | 50 || Parabolic trough
|9|| with 9h heat storage
|-
|Puertollano Solar Thermal Power Plant ||  || Puertollano, Ciudad Real ||
| align="right" | 50 || Parabolic trough
| || Completed May 2009
|-
|Alvarado I || ||Badajoz||  
| align="right" |50|| Parabolic trough
| ||Completed July 2009
|-
| La Florida || ||Alvarado (Badajoz)||
| align="right" |50|| Parabolic trough
| ||Completed July 2010
|-
| Arenales PS|| ||Morón de la Frontera (Seville)||
| align="right" |50|| Parabolic trough
| || 2013
|-
| Casablanca|| || Talarrubias ||
| align="right" |50|| Parabolic trough
| || 2013
|-
| Majadas de Tiétar || ||Caceres|| 
| align="right" |50|| Parabolic trough
| || Completed August 2010
|-
| La Dehesa|| ||La Garrovilla (Badajoz)|| 
| align="right" |50|| Parabolic trough
| || Completed November 2010
|-
| Lebrija-1 || ||Lebrija|| 
| align="right" |50|| Parabolic trough
| || Completed July 2011
|-
|Astexol 2|| ||Badajoz|| 
| align="right" |50|| Parabolic trough
|7.5|| Completed November 2011, with 7.5h thermal energy storage
|-
| Morón || || Morón de la Frontera || 
| align="right" |50|| Parabolic trough
| || Completed May 2012
|-
| La Africana|| || Posada ||
| align="right" |50|| Parabolic trough
|7.5|| Completed July 2012, with 7.5h thermal energy storage
|-
| Olivenza 1|| || Olivenza|| 
| align="right" |50|| Parabolic trough
| || Completed July 2012
|-
| Orellana |||| Orellana la Vieja || 
| align="right" |50|| Parabolic trough
| || Completed August 2012
|-
| Godawari Green Energy Limited ||  || Nokh Village, Rajasthan ||  
| align="right" |50|| Parabolic trough
| || 2013
|-
| Enerstar Villena Power Plant ||  || Villena || 
| align="right" |50|| Parabolic trough
| || Completed 2013
|-
| Megha Solar Plant ||  || Anantapur || 
| align="right" |50|| Parabolic trough
| || Completed 2014
|-
| Delingha Solar Plant ||  || Delingha || 
| align="right" |50|| Parabolic trough
| 9|| Completed July 2018 with 9 hours of thermal energy storage
|-
| Shagaya CSP ||  || Shagaya || 
| align="right" |50|| Parabolic trough
|10|| Commercial operation started in February 2019, 10 hours thermal storage
|-
| Waad Al Shamal ISCC Plant ||  || Waad Al Shamal ||  
| align="right" |50|| ISCC with parabolic trough
| || Commercial operation started in 2018, 1,390 MW plant with 50 MW solar<ref>SEC starts operating solar-powered plant in Waad Al-Shamal , Saudi Gazette, July 9, 2018</ref>
|-
|Qinghai Gonghe CSP ||  || Gonghe, Qinghai Province || 
| align="right" |50|| Solar power tower
|6||Completed in September 2019, with 6 h heat storage.
|-
| Luneng Haixi CSP ||  || Haixi Zhou, Qinghai Sheng || 
| align="right" |50|| Solar power tower 
| 12 || Completed in September 2019 with 12 hours of thermal energy storage
|-
|Hami CSP ||  || Hami, Xinjiang Autonomous Region || 
| align="right" |50|| Solar power tower || 13 || Completed in September 2019 with 13 hours of thermal energy storage
|-
| Yumen Xinneng CSP || || Yumen, Gansu Province || 
| align="right" |50||2020|| Beam down tower ||9h storage
|}

 Under construction 

 Announced 

 Cancelled 

 Decommissioned 
Eurelios pilot plant, a 1 MW, power tower design in Adrano, Sicily, operational 1981–1987
Solar One pilot plant, operational 1982–1986; converted into Solar Two, operational 1995–1999; site demolished 2009 – USA California, 10 MW, power tower design
SES-5 – USSR, 5 MW, power tower design, water / Steam, service period 1985–1989
Maricopa Solar – USA Peoria, Arizona, 1.5 MW dish stirling SES / Tessera Solar's first commercial-scale Dish Stirling power plant. Completed January 2010, decommissioned September 2011 and sold to CondiSys Solar Technology of China in April 2012.

Largest plants by technology

See also

Concentrated solar power
List of concentrating solar thermal power companies
List of energy storage projects
List of large wind farms
List of largest power stations in the world
List of photovoltaic power stations
Plataforma Solar de Almería
Renewable energy commercialization
Renewable energy industry
Solar power by country
Solar power in China
Solar power plants in the Mojave Desert
Solar thermal energy
Solar Turbine Plants

References

Further readingClean Tech Nation: How the U.S. Can Lead in the New Global Economy (2012) by Ron Pernick and Clint WilderDeploying Renewables 2011 (2011) by the International Energy AgencyReinventing Fire: Bold Business Solutions for the New Energy Era (2011) by Amory LovinsRenewable Energy Sources and Climate Change Mitigation (2011) by the IPCCSolar Energy Perspectives (2011) by the International Energy AgencyEnergy Transition in Metropolises, Rural Areas and Deserts'' (2020) by Wiley

External links
 CSP World
 CSP plants and projects plotted on Google Earth
 National Renewable Energy Laboratories list of US Solar Trough Plants

 
Solar
Solar thermal
Solar